Ashok Tanwar  (born 12 February 1976) is an Indian politician, former President of Haryana Pradesh Congress Committee, Member of Parliament from Sirsa and Secretary, All India Congress Committee. He was also a former president of Indian Youth Congress and NSUI. He was the youngest person to become the president of Indian Youth Congress.

Early life
He was born in a chamar caste to a family of farmer in Chimni, Jhajjar district, Haryana to Dilbag Singh and Krishna Rathi. He did his BA from the Kakatiya University, Warangal. He went to Jawaharlal Nehru University's centre for Historical studies and completed his M.A., M.Phil. and Ph.D. (Medieval Indian History).

Political career
Tanwar started his career as an activist of the NSUI in JNU.

Youth politics
Tanwar rose to prominence when he fought the election for the president of student union of JNU. He became NSUI's secretary in 1999 and its president in 2003. Under his leadership, the NSUI won two elections in the Delhi University Students' Union (DUSU) since he took over in 2003 and improved its performance in the Left dominated JNU.

During Ashok Tanwar's term as president, the Indian Youth Congress tried to strengthen its network at block, district and state level through workshops, seminars, street plays and social work related to the public issues.

Lok Sabha elections
In 2009 he won the Lok Sabha elections from Sirsa in Haryana as a Congress party's candidate with a margin of 35499 votes. However he lost the 2014 Lok Sabha elections as Congress Party's candidate to Charanjeet Singh Rori of Indian National Lok Dal.

President of Haryana Pradesh Congress Committee
He became the president of Haryana Pradesh Congress Committee on 14 February 2014. He was succeeded by Selja Kumari as party president on 4 September 2019. He quit the Indian National Congress on 5 October 2019.

Personal life
In June 2005, Ashok Tanwar married Avantika Maken, daughter of Lalit Maken and maternal granddaughter of former Indian President, Dr. Shankar Dayal Sharma. They have three children, two sons and one daughter, Anirudh, Adikarta and Abhistada.

References

External links
Ashok Tanwar Official Page
Indian Youth Congress
Official biographical sketch in Parliament of India website

Living people
Indian National Congress politicians
People from Jhajjar
Jawaharlal Nehru University alumni
People from Delhi
Indian Youth Congress Presidents
India MPs 2009–2014
1976 births
Lok Sabha members from Haryana
Trinamool Congress politicians